Flindt Landing is an unincorporated place and railway point in Unorganized Thunder Bay District in northwestern Ontario, Canada.

It is on the Canadian National Railway transcontinental main line, between Savant Lake to the west and Harvey to the east, where the line crosses an embankment over Heathcote Lake, part of the Flindt River system. Flindt Landing railway station is located at the place, served by Via Rail transcontinental Canadian trains.

References

Communities in Thunder Bay District